N'Gai Croal is a video game critic and consultant, previously employed by Newsweek, currently involved in his own consultancy company.

Croal started out as consumer technology writer at Newsweek, later writing the Newsweek-associated Level Up blog.

In 2008, Croal criticised alleged racism in the Japanese game Resident Evil 5.

References

Living people
Newsweek people
Video game critics
Year of birth missing (living people)